Hubert is a Germanic masculine given name, from hug "mind" and beraht "bright". It also occurs as a surname. 

Saint Hubertus or Hubert (c. 656 – 30 May 727) is the patron saint of hunters, mathematicians, opticians, and metalworkers.

People with the given name Hubert 
This is a small selection of articles on people named Hubert; for a comprehensive list see instead .
Hubert Aaronson (1924–2005), F. Mehl University Professor at Carnegie Mellon University
Hubert Adair (1917–1940), World War II Royal Air Force pilot 
Hubert Badanai (1895–1986), Canadian automobile dealer and politician
Hubert Boulard, a French comics creator who is unusually credited as "Hubert"
Hubert Brasier (1917–1981), a Church of England clergyman, more famously the father of UK Prime Minister Theresa May
Hubert Buchanan (born 1941), a United States Air Force captain and fighter pilot
Hubert Chevis (1902–1931), a lieutenant in the Royal Artillery of the British Army who died of strychnine poisoning in June 1931
Hubert Davies, British playwright and director
Hubert Davis (disambiguation)
Hubert Dreyfus (1929–2017), American philosopher
Hubert, Duke of Spoleto (died c.969), illegitimate son of King Hugh of Italy 
Hubert van Eyck (c.1385–1426), Early Dutch painter
Hubert Fattal (1970–2022), Lebanese businessman
Hubert Fichte (1935–1986), German novelist
Hubert Gallant (born 1955), former Canadian professional wrestler
Hubert Geralds (born 1964), American fugitive
Hubert de Givenchy (1921–2018), French fashion designer who founded the house of Givenchy in 1952
Hubert von Goisern (born 1952), Austrian musician
Hubert Gough (1870–1963), senior officer in the British Army and commander of British Fifth Army in the First World War
Hubert von Herkomer (1849–1914), German-born British painter, film-director and composer
Hubert Humphrey (1911–1978), American politician, Vice President of the United States
Hubert Hurkacz (born 1997), Polish tennis player
Hubert Hüppe (born 1956), German politician
Hubert Ingraham (born 1947), Prime Minister of the Bahamas
Hubert Kitchen (1928–2020), Canadian politician
Hubert Lampo (1920–2006), Flemish writer
Hubert Lanz (1896–1982), German general
Hubert Laws (born 1939), American flutist and saxophonist
Hubert Lenoir (born 1994), French Canadian, singer, musician
Hubert Loutsch (1878–1946), Prime Minister of Luxembourg
Hubert von Luschka (1820–1875), German anatomist
Hubert Lyautey (1854–1934), French general
Hubert Maga (1916–2000), President of Dahomey
Hubertus van Mook (1894–1965), Governor-General of the Dutch East Indies, one of the principal commanders of Indonesian National Revolution
Hubert Nelson, multiple people
Hubert Parker (disambiguation)
Hubert Pierlot (1883–1963), Belgian Prime Minister
Hubert Robert (1733–1808), French landscape painter
Hubert Roberts (born 1961), American-Israeli basketball player
Hubert Strolz (born 1962), Austrian alpine skier
Hubert Sumlin (1931–2011), American blues guitarist and singer
Hubert Van Innis (1868–1961), Belgian archer
Hubert Walter (c. 1160–1205) Archbishop of Canterbury and Lord Chancellor of England
Hubert Walter (1930–2008), German anthropologist
Hubert Blaine Wolfeschlegelsteinhausenbergerdorff Sr., a man with the longest last name in recorded history
Hubert W. Woodruff (1923–2019), American lawyer and politician
Hubert Wu (born 1990), Hong Kong singer-songwriter and actor
Hubert Wulfranc (born 1956), French politician
Hubert Zafke (1920–2018), Nazi S.S. medic

Fictional characters
 Hubert, the titular pig in the French animated comedy series Hubert and Takako
 King Hubert, a fictional character from the 1959 Disney film Sleeping Beauty
 Hubert Ambrewster, a character on the TV sitcom The Ropers
 Sir Hubert Blunt, a character in the 1980s animated television series Dragon's Lair
 Hubert Cumberdale, a fictional character from David Firth's Salad Fingers
 Huey Duck, full name Hubert Duck
 Professor Hubert J. Farnsworth, a fictional professor from the animated sitcom Futurama
 Lieutenant Hubert Gruber, a character in the BBC sitcom 'Allo 'Allo!
 Hubert Oswell, a character from the video game Tales of Graces
 Hubert von Vestra, a character from the video game Fire Emblem: Three Houses

People with the surname Hubert 
Allison Hubert (1901–1978), American football player
Andy Hubert (born 1990), German footballer 
Anthoine Hubert (1996–2019), French racing driver
David Hubert (born 1988), Belgian footballer
Étienne Hubert (disambiguation), several people
Guy Hubert (born 1979), Malagasy footballer
Henri Hubert (1872–1927), French archaeologist and sociologist
Janet Hubert (born 1956), American film and television actress
Konrad Hubert (1507–1577), German Reformed theologian
Laëtitia Hubert (born 1974), French figure skater
Tom Hubert (born 1964), American road course racer
Wyatt Hubert (born 1998), American football player

Variations 
Hobart (given name) and Hobart (surname) (English)
Hub (Dutch, e.g., Hub van Doorne)
Hubbert (surname)
Hubertas (Lithuanian, e.g. Hubertas Grušnys)
Huberto (Spanish)
Hubertus (Dutch, German, Latin)
Hubrecht (Dutch)
Huib, Huibert, Huibrecht, Huijbrecht (Dutch)
Hupert (surname)
Huppert (given name and surname)
Hupperts (surname)
Huppertz (surname)
Huprecht (German)
Huub, Huybert, Huybrecht (Dutch)
Uberto (Italian)

Popularity
In England and Wales, Hubert was the 65th most commonly given male name in 1904, 71st in 1914 and 87th in 1924.  By 1934 it had dropped out of the Top 100.

See also
Heber, Anglicisation of the Irish Gaelic given name Éibhear
Hebert,  a Germanic given name
Hibbert, given name derived from Hildebert
Huber, German occupational surname

References

Germanic masculine given names
Dutch masculine given names
English masculine given names
French masculine given names
Germanic-language surnames
German masculine given names
Polish masculine given names
Surnames of Norman origin
Surnames from given names